Betony Vernon (born August 15, 1968) is an American jewelry designer based in Paris. She produces luxurious erotic jewelry.

Early life and education 
Born in Tazewell, Virginia, Vernon is the third of four daughters. Her mother Ann Dearsley Vernon, was a British civil rights activist and art historian, and her father was an American pilot and inventor.

In 1990 she graduated cum laude from Virginia Commonwealth University with a degree in Art History and a double minor in Religious Studies and Goldsmithing.

After graduation, Vernon moved to Florence, Italy, to direct the metal-smithing program at Fuji Studio Art Workshop.

In 1992, Vernon developed her first erotic jewelry collection, naming it Sado-Chic.

After 5 years in Florence, she moved to Milan. Here she earned a master's degree in Industrial Design from Domus Academy. At the same time she founded her first design studio “Atelier B.V.” in Milan and she created one-of-a-kind objects for Luisa Via Roma.

Career 
In 1995 and 1998 she designed table objects for Florentine silversmith Pampaloni. During that time, she was also appointed as Design Director for the Italian interior design house Fornasetti.

Vernon has collaborated with several fashion designers, including Missoni, Alain Tondowski, Gianfranco Ferré and Jean-Paul Gaultier. In 2006, she designed a neckpiece for Swarovski’s Runway Rocks project that was later used by Lady Gaga for her Paparazzi video.

In 2006, Vernon worked with Los Angeles-based photographer Jeff Burton in the museum house of Carlo Mollino in Turin, Italy.

Vernon made “L’Envol” in 2008, a short video for SHOWstudio and her first collaboration with Nick Knight. Betony wrote, hosted, and co-produced “The Boudoir” for MTV Italy. The episodes aired on Love Line, a show dedicated to sexual education.

In November 2012, Vernon designed the Origin Chair, a functional sculpture carved in statuary marble from Monte Altissimo, Italy. It was unveiled in December 2012 at the Triennale Museum of Design and has since traveled to MUDAC - Museum of Design and Contemporary Art, Lausanne. In November 2015, the work was exhibited in Vernon's carte blanche for the Gewerbemuseum, Winterthur.

In 2017, Vernon unveils her Boudoir Box (1999-2000, leather case and sterling silver objects) for the first time to the general public as part of the Medusa exhibition at the City of Paris Museum of Modern Art.

In her Paris atelier she receives clients for bespoke fittings.

Personal life 
From 2004 to 2014, Vernon was married to Barnaba Fornasetti, son of Piero Fornasetti. She lives in Paris, France.

Exhibitions 

 1993 - Primordi, international design, Triennale, Milan
 1995 - Anni 90, Arte a Milano, Triennale, Milan
 1999 - Il Classico, Norma e Variazione, Abitare il Tempo, Verona, Italy
 2003 - Body Craze Selfridges, London
 2005 - Touch Me, Victoria & Albert Museum, Contemporary Gallery, London
 2008 - Sex in Design, Design in Sex, Museum of Sex, New York
 2009 - Red Light Design - Salone del Mobile, Milan
 2009 - The Fashion Body - Somerset House, London
 2011 - Alta Rom Alta Moda - Casanatense Library, Rome
 2012 - Selling Sex - SHOWStudio, London
 2013 - KAMA - Sex and Design, Triennale Design Museum, Milan
 2013 - GRASSI Museum of Applied Arts, Leipzig, Germany
 2015 - Nirvana - Mudac, Lausanne
 2016 - Nirvana - Gewerbemuseum, Winterthur
 2016 - Body - Anthropogenicbody, Wroclaw, Poland
 2017 - Medusa - Musée d'Art Moderne de la Ville de Paris, France

Bibliography

References

External links
 

American jewelry designers
Living people
1968 births
American industrial designers
American expatriates in France
People from Tazewell, Virginia
Artists from Virginia
20th-century American artists
20th-century American women artists
21st-century American artists
21st-century American women artists
Virginia Commonwealth University alumni
Domus Academy alumni
American people of British descent
Women jewellers